Hoheria angustifolia, the narrow-leaved lacebark or narrow-leaved houhere, is a species of flowering plant in the family Malvaceae, endemic to New Zealand. Known as Houhere or Houhi in Māori, the bark of the tree was occasionally used for traditional textiles, similar to the traditional use of Hoheria populnea.

It has grey-green to dark green leaves, and white flowers from December to February. The adult leaves are narrow and coarsely toothed hence the common name of narrow-leaved lacebark. Distribution is larger than any of the other lacebark species and can be found mostly in the eastern South Island, and in the North Island from Taranaki down.

Etymology
Hoheria is derived from the Maori vernacular name for this genus, houhere or hoihere.

Angustifolia means 'with narrow leaves'.

References

angustifolia
Endemic flora of New Zealand
Taxa named by Étienne Raoul